Sciapus platypterus is a species of fly in the family Dolichopodidae. It is found in the  Palearctic.

References

External links
Images representing Sciapus at BOLD

Sciapodinae
Insects described in 1805
Asilomorph flies of Europe
Taxa named by Johan Christian Fabricius